Kong (孔) is a Chinese and Korean surname. It can also be written as Kung in Taiwan, Hung in Hong Kong, Khổng in Vietnam, and Gong in Korea. There are around 2.1 million people with this surname in China in 2002, representing 0.23% of the population. In 2018, it was the 97th-most common surname in China. It is the 25th name in the Hundred Family Surnames poem.

Kong is most notable as the surname of Confucius and his descendants, whose family tree is the world's longest, covering over 2,500 years and more than 80 generations, in two million entries as of 2009. The main line of descent traditionally held the title of Duke Yansheng, which was changed to the title of the first Sacrificial Official to Confucius in the 20th century. This title is currently held by Kung Tsui-chang.

Kong may also be the English transliteration of a rare Chinese surname 空, or a less common form of the Gong surnames such as 龔, 貢 and 弓.

Origin

The character for the Kong surname was derived from the Zi (子) family name.  The founder of the Shang Dynasty, Tang of Shang whose family name was Zi, had the temple name of Taiyi (太乙). His descendants fused the character Zi (子) to Yi (乙), forming the character Kong (孔) which eventually became a surname.  It first appeared during the Zhou Dynasty as the courtesy name Kongfu (孔父) of a noble in the State of Song named Jia (嘉), said to be a descendant of the Tang of Shang. Kongfu Jia was murdered, and his son escaped to the State of Lu where he adopted Kong as the name of his clan.  His family settled in Qufu and Confucius was one of his descendants.

The Kong surname may also have originated from a number of other sources.  Others had adopted Kong as their surname because it was part of their ancestors' name.  For example, in the State of Zheng, two  of Duke Mu of Zheng's (鄭穆公) sons (surname Ji) (姬), had Shikong (士孔) and Zikong (子孔) as their respective courtesy names, and their descendants took Kong as their surname.  Similarly, there was a noble in the State of Chen named Kongning (孔宁, originally of surname Gui (妫)), and another in the State of Qi named Konghui (孔虺, originally of surname Jiang (姜)); the descendants of both also adopted the surname Kong.

Some of the non-Han Chinese people used Kong as their surname, such as  the Derung, Jingpo, Tibetan, and the Yugur people.  Various Manchu clans also simplified their surnames to Kong.

Notable bearers

 Confucius (Kong Qiu)

Kong 

 Kong Anguo (156 – c. 74 BC), Confucian scholar and government official of the Western Han dynasty
 Augustine Kong, statistical geneticist
 Kong Ji (481–402 BC), Chinese philosopher and grandson of Confucius
 Kong Qingdong
 Kong Rong
 Kong Shangren
 Kong Tai Heong
 Kong Yingda
 Kong Youde
 Kong Zhaoshou

Kung 
 H. H. Kung (1881–1967), banker and politician in the Republic of China
 H. T. Kung (born 1945), Taiwanese-born American computer scientist
 Kung Te-cheng (1920–2008), Duke Yansheng, Confucian ceremonial official
 Kung Tsui-chang (born 1975), Confucian ceremonial official

Gong 

 Gong Chan-shik, member of South Korean boy group B1A4
 Gong Hyo-jin (孔曉振), South Korean actress
 Gong Ji-young (孔枝泳), South Korean female writer
 Gong Min-ji (known as Minzy), South Korean soloist, dancer, rapper, and former member of South Korean girl group 2NE1
 Gong Yoo (孔劉), South Korean actor
 Gong Oh-kyun (Korean: 공오균, Hanja: 孔五均), former South Korean football player and a professional coach, manager of the Vietnam national under-23 football team

Hung 
 William Hung (孔慶翔, Kǒng Qìngxiáng), American singer from Hong Kong

See also

Confucius Genealogy Compilation Committee

References 

Chinese-language surnames
Korean-language surnames
Individual Chinese surnames
Surnames of Cambodian origin
Khmer-language surnames